The GWF North American Heavyweight Championship was the major title in the Global Wrestling Federation in Texas. The title existed from 1991 until 1994, when GWF closed. The title was featured on the promotion's show that aired nationally on ESPN.

Title history

Tournaments

1991
The GWF North American Heavyweight Championship Tournament was a twenty-four man tournament for the inaugural GWF North American Heavyweight Championship held on August 9 and August 10, 1991. The Patriot defeated Al Perez in the final to win the tournament.

Footnotes

See also
Global Wrestling Federation

References

Global Wrestling Federation championships
Heavyweight wrestling championships
North American professional wrestling championships